Subbaromyces is a genus of fungi in the family Ophiostomataceae. It was named to honour Yellapragada Subbarow.

References

External links

Sordariomycetes genera
Ophiostomatales